Blackpool Cricket Club is  a cricket club based in Stanley Park, in Blackpool, Lancashire.  Located in western quadrant of the park, the club plays at a 5,000-seater ground, which is regularly used for county cricket matches by Lancashire.

The club's 1st and 2nd XI play in the ECB Northern Premier League while its 3rd XI and Sunday Development XI turn out in the Palace Shield, and its 4th XI in the Fylde League.  Its players include first-class cricketer Steven Croft.

Raikes Hall
Blackpool Cricket Club first formed in 1888 and they regularly played at Raikes Hall pleasure gardens. In 1889, R.G. Barlow organised the All England XI to play at the site against the Blackpool team.

Whitegate Park
Due to repairs being needed at the Raikes Hall site in 1893, the Blackpool Athletic Ground Company decided to give the club a more permanent home at Whitegate Park. The new ground covered an area of 150yds by 130yds.
The first recorded match on the ground came in 1893, when Blackpool played the touring Australians, who were on their Ashes tour.
The inaugural first-class match to be played on the ground was between the North and the South in the 1905 North v South fixture.  Lancashire played their first first-class match on the ground in 1905 when they played against an England XI.  From 1905 to the present day, the club's ground has played host to 98 first-class matches, the last of which came in the 2008 County Championship between Lancashire and Surrey.
In the early 1920s the whitegate site no longer hosted other sports therefore it was decided the site would be dedicated to the Blackpool Cricket Club.

Stanley Park

In 1925, the grounds were renamed 'Stanley Park' as it sat within the boundary of the new park and continued to be the home of Blackpool Cricket Club. Sir Lindsay Parkinson donated the ground, valued at £10,000 to the club shortly before it was renamed Stanley Park. The ground is managed by Blackpool Cricket Club and the deeds are held in trust by the mayor.
The club played in the Ribblesdale League and were part of the founding members whom created the Northern League. Blackpool have also won the National Club Cricket Championship in 1990.

Former players
Many professionals have played at the club including: Peter Fairclough, Harold Larwood (played in 1939), Jim Parks, Cecil Parkin, Ted McDonald, Stewart Dempster, Ken James, Bill Alley, Hanif Mohammad, Rohan Kanhai, Cammie Smith, Mushtaq Mohammad, Collis King, Maninder Singh, Richie Richardson and Steven Croft.
Arthur Shrewsbury and Johnny Briggs played at the ground in 1891.

References

External links

English club cricket teams
Sport in Blackpool
1893 establishments in England
Cricket in Lancashire